Froun    is a village in the  Bint Jbeil District in southern Lebanon.

Name
According to E. H. Palmer, the name Furûn comes from "the ovens" or "reservoirs".

History
In 1881, the PEF's Survey of Western Palestine (SWP)  described it: "A village, built of stone, containing 100 Metawileh, situated on a hill and surrounded by small gardens and arable land. The water is supplied from rock-cut cisterns."

References

Bibliography

External links
Froun, Localiban
Survey of Western Palestine, Map 2:   IAA, Wikimedia commons
 

Populated places in the Israeli security zone 1985–2000
Populated places in Bint Jbeil District
Shia Muslim communities in Lebanon